Loxophlebia braziliensis is a moth of the subfamily Arctiinae. It was described by Rothschild in 1911. It is found in Brazil (Santa Catarina).

References

 Natural History Museum Lepidoptera generic names catalog

Loxophlebia
Moths described in 1911